Retrocausal is the second studio album by Cleric, released on December 8, 2017 by Web of Mimicry.

Reception
Critic Emmett Palaima called Retrocausal Cleric's most extensive work and said "it's a lot to take in and most certainly isn’t for the faint of ear, but the level of musicianship put into it is worth recognition."

Track listing

Personnel
Adapted from the Retrocausal liner notes.

Cleric
 Matt Hollenberg – guitars
 Daniel Ephraim Kennedy – bass guitar, guitar
 Larry Kwartowitz – drums, percussion
 Nick Shellenberger – vocals, keyboards, sampler, photography, design, guitar (6, 7), bass guitar (7, 8), war drums (8)

Additional musicians
 Mick Barr – guitar (5)
 Timb Harris – violin (1)
 John Zorn – alto saxophone (9)

Production and design
 Jess Conda – photography, design
 Jamie Lawson – photography, design
 Colin Marston – engineering, mixing, mastering
 Jackson Shellenberger – photography, design

Release history

References

External links 
 Retrocausal at Bandcamp
 Retrocausal at Discogs (list of releases)

2017 albums
Cleric (band) albums
Web of Mimicry albums